The 2012 Canoe Slalom World Cup was a series of five races in 5 canoeing and kayaking categories organized by the International Canoe Federation (ICF). It was the 25th edition.

Calendar 

The series opened with World Cup Race 1 in Cardiff, Wales (June 8–10) and ended with the World Cup Final in Bratislava, Slovakia (August 31 – September 2).

Final standings 

The winner of each race was awarded 60 points. Points for lower places differed from one category to another. Every participant was guaranteed at least 2 points for participation and 5 points for qualifying for the semifinal run. If two or more athletes or boats were equal on points, the ranking was determined by their positions in the World Cup Final.

Results

World Cup Race 1 

The opening race of the series took place at the Cardiff International White Water facility in Wales from 8 to 10 June. It was set to start on June 8 with heats in the men's and women's C1 and the men's K1. Rain and wind forced the organizers to cancel these heats and the competition resumed a day later with semifinals in these events. David Florence made history by becoming the first paddler to win two gold medals in one world cup meeting. He won the men's C1 and C2 events. Great Britain won the medal table with 2 golds and 1 bronze.

World Cup Race 2 

The second world cup race of the season took place at the Pau-Pyrénées Whitewater Stadium, France from 15 to 17 June. It was dominated by the home French paddlers who won 4 golds, 1 silver and 1 bronze.

World Cup Race 3 

The third round of the world cup series took place at the Segre Olympic Park in La Seu d'Urgell, Spain from 22 to 24 June. It was once again dominated by the French paddlers who took home 3 golds, 1 silver and 2 bronzes. Spain won one gold and one bronze.

World Cup Race 4 

The penultimate round of the world cup series took place at the Prague-Troja Canoeing Centre, Czech Republic from 24 to 26 August. French paddlers continued their success by winning 3 golds and 2 silvers. The home Czech team could only manage 1 bronze medal in the men's single canoe. Étienne Daille sealed the overall world cup title before the final round thanks to his third straight win and fourth straight podium finish.

World Cup Final 

The final event of the series took place in Bratislava, Slovakia from 31 August to  2 September and it was the home country that emerged at the top of the medal table thanks to 3 gold medals. The overall world cup champions were crowned at this event.

References

External links 
 International Canoe Federation

Canoe Slalom World Cup
Canoe Slalom World Cup